The Winterbourne Academy, is a co-educational school in South Gloucestershire. The school is in the village of Winterbourne in South Gloucestershire, on the outskirts of Bristol, England.

History
The Ridings High School was founded in 1957. It was opened by the then Member of Parliament for Bristol South East, Tony Benn.

Academy proposal
In 2007, Rob Gibson (Headteacher at the time) was invited by the Department for Children, Schools and Families (DCSF) to consider a move to Academy status as the Lead (non-financial) sponsor in a hard federation, incorporating King Edmund Community School in Yate. As a result, in September 2009, The Ridings' Federation of Academies was established with two independent academies, Winterbourne International Academy (formerly 'The Ridings High School' and the lead sponsor) and Yate International Academy (formerly King Edmund Community School). The two academies have since parted ways, and now operate under separate trusts.

Rob Gibson became the Chief Executive Principal in 2009 of the Federation but left at the end of 2014. Beverley Martin became Chief Executive Principal of the Federation in 2015 and Principal of Yate International Academy. The Winterbourne Academy has approximately 1,820 students on roll including 370 in its sixth form. Winterbourne Academy used to base its curriculum models upon the International Baccalaureate Middle Years Programme. The Winterbourne International Academy delivered the International Baccalaureate Diploma (post-16). International Baccalaureate results were consistently above the International benchmark pass rate of 80%. Since 2008, The Winterbourne International Academy has had three students awarded the prestigious Prime Minister's Global Fellowship: students have used these awards to travel to China and Brazil. Following major changes at the academy, the International Baccalaureate Diploma was dropped, and thus Winterbourne International Academy became solely Winterbourne Academy.

The Principal of Winterbourne Mr Rob Evans announced that he was going to be resigning in 2015. Mr Richard Haupt took his place of Principal on 1 June 2015.

In September 2018 Jason Beardmore became the new principal, taking over from Peter Smart who had been interim headteacher since 2017

Academic standards
The school (and now Academy) has expanded since its inception, providing services such as a technology college, Arts Centre and Sixth Form. 
Since 2006 it has offered the International Baccalaureate, becoming the first school in South Gloucestershire to offer this qualification, and even attracting students from abroad. It hosts the most popular Sixth Form in the county, with children joining at the age of 16 from all of the other local secondary schools.

The OFSTED dashboard for WIA may be found at: http://dashboard.ofsted.gov.uk/dash.php?urn=135944 and the inspection reports at: http://reports.ofsted.gov.uk/inspection-reports/find-inspection-report/provider/ELS/135944.

New build 
The school was granted £19.3 million to finance their new build. In January 2013, the new school opened at the end of 2014.

Notable former pupils
 International rugby player, Dave Attwood
 Author, Nathan Filer
 Former Bristol Rovers goalkeeper, Mike Green
 Winter Olympic Bronze medallist, Jenny Jones
 Singer in duo Bars and Melody, Charlie Lenehan
 Former football player and manager Gary Megson
 Mark Zanker, Red Arrows pilot from 1994–96 and RAF Harrier pilot, now a Boeing 747-400 (freight) pilot with Cathay Pacific since 1999
 Wayne Hussey, musician. Singer with The Mission, guitarist with The Sisters of Mercy and Dead or Alive
Chelsea FC player Kyle Scott
Cricketer, Sam Bracey
Broadcaster [BBC Radio], screenwriter [The Last Detective], TV producer Richard Leslie Lewis
Weatherman Alex Beresford

References

External links

 

Civil Parish of Winterbourne
Educational institutions established in 1957
Secondary schools in South Gloucestershire District
1957 establishments in England
Academies in South Gloucestershire District